The Shaoshan 9 (Chinese: 韶山9) is a type of electric locomotive used on China Railway. They are mainly used in pulling sub-highspeed passenger trains. Developed and built by CSR Zhuzhou Electric Locomotive Works, the SS9 was designed for the fifth national railway speedup, and 2 prototypes were completed on December 26, 1998.

Modified version
Zhuzhou built 43 first generation SS9's. Beginning in 2002, a modified version of the SS9 was designed and built. A total of 173(0004 & 0044～0213) SS9s have been built.

Accident
Number SS9-0004 was scrapped and replaced by a new modified one due to a derailment accident which occurred on November 19, 2004.

External links

 SS9 electric locomotive_Official product specification (Zhuzhou)

25 kV AC locomotives
Co-Co locomotives
SS9
Zhuzhou locomotives
Railway locomotives introduced in 1998